Sir John Murray  (3 March 1841 – 16 March 1914) was a pioneering Canadian-born British oceanographer, marine biologist and limnologist. He is considered to be the father of modern oceanography.

Early life and education
Murray was born at Cobourg, Canada West (now Ontario) on 3 March 1841. He was the second son of Robert Murray, an accountant, and his wife Elizabeth Macfarlane. His parents had emigrated from Scotland to Ontario in about 1834. He went to school in London, Ontario and later to Cobourg College. In 1858, at the age of 17 he returned to Scotland to live with his grandfather, John Macfarlane, and continue his education at Stirling High School. In 1864 he enrolled at University of Edinburgh to study medicine however he did not complete his studies and did not graduate.

In 1868 he joined the whaling ship, Jan Mayen, as ship's surgeon and visited Spitsbergen and Jan Mayen Island. During the seven-month trip, he collected marine specimens and recorded ocean currents, ice movements and the weather.

On his return to Edinburgh he re-entered the University to complete his studies (1868–72) in geology under Sir Archibald Geikie.

Challenger Expedition
In 1872 Murray assisted in preparing scientific apparatus for the Challenger Expedition under the direction of the expedition's chief scientist, Charles Wyville Thomson. When a position on the expedition became available Murray joined the crew as a naturalist. During the four-year voyage, he assisted in the research of the oceans including collecting marine samples, making and noting observations, and making improvements to marine instrumentation. After the expedition, Murray was appointed Chief Assistant at the Challenger offices in Edinburgh where he managed and organised the collection. After Thomson's death in 1882, Murray became Director of the office and in 1896 published The Report on the Scientific Results of the Voyage of HMS Challenger, a work of more than 50 volumes of reports.

Murray renamed his house, on Boswall Road in northern Edinburgh, Challenger Lodge in recognition of the expedition. The building now houses St Columba's Hospice.

Marine Laboratory, Granton
In 1884, Murray set up the Marine Laboratory at Granton, Edinburgh, the first of its kind in the United Kingdom. In 1894, this laboratory was moved to Millport, Isle of Cumbrae, on the Firth of Clyde, and became the University Marine Biological Station, Millport, the forerunner of today's Scottish Association for Marine Science at Dunstaffnage, near Oban, Argyll and Bute.

Bathymetrical survey of the fresh-water lochs of Scotland
After completing the Challenger Expedition reports, Murray began work surveying the freshwater lochs of Scotland. He was assisted by Frederick Pullar and over a period of three years, they surveyed 15 lochs together. In 1901 Pullar drowned as a result of an ice-skating accident which caused Murray to consider abandoning the survey work. However, Pullar's father, Laurence Pullar, persuaded him to continue and gave £10,000 towards the completion of the survey. Murray coordinated a team of nearly 50 people who took more than 60,000 individual depth soundings and recorded other physical characteristics of the 562 lochs. The resulting 6 volume Bathymetrical Survey of the Fresh-Water Lochs of Scotland was published in 1910.

 The cartographer John George Bartholomew, who strove to advance geographical and scientific understanding through his cartographic work, drafted and published all the maps of the Survey.

North Atlantic oceanographic expedition
In 1909 Murray indicated to the International Council for the Exploration of the Sea that an oceanographic survey of the North Atlantic should be undertaken. After Murray agreed to pay all expenses, the Norwegian Government lent him the research ship Michael Sars and its scientific crew. He was joined on board by the Norwegian marine biologist Johan Hjort and the ship departed Plymouth in April 1910 for a four-month expedition to take physical and biological observations at all depths between Europe and North America. Murray and Hjort published their findings in The Depths of the Ocean in 1912 and it became a classic for marine naturalists and oceanographers.

He was the first to note the existence of the Mid-Atlantic Ridge and of oceanic trenches. He also noted the presence of deposits derived from the Saharan desert in deep ocean sediments and published many papers on his findings.

Awards, recognition and legacy

 Fellow of the Royal Society of Edinburgh (1877) 
 Neill Medal from the Royal Society of Edinburgh (1877)
 Makdougall Brisbane Prize from the Royal Society of Edinburgh (1884)
 Founder's Medal from the Royal Geographical Society (1895)
 Fellow of the Royal Society (1896) 
 Knight Commander of the Order of the Bath (1898)
 Cullum Geographical Medal from the American Geographical Society (1899) 
 Clarke Medal from the Royal Society of New South Wales (1900)
 Livingstone Medal from the Royal Scottish Geographical Society (1910)
 Vega Medal from the Swedish Society for Anthropology and Geography (1912)
Other awards included the Cuvier Prize and Medal from the Institut de France and the Humboldt Medal of the Gesellschaft für Erdkunde zu Berlin.

He was president of the Royal Scottish Geographical Society from 1898 to 1904.

In 1911, Murray founded the Alexander Agassiz Medal which is awarded by the National Academy of Sciences, in memory of his friend Alexander Agassiz (1835–1910).

After his death his estate funded the John Murray Travelling Studentship Fund and the 1933 John Murray Mabahiss Expedition to the Indian Ocean.

Death
Murray lived at Challenger Lodge (renamed after his expedition) on Boswall Road in Trinity, Edinburgh, with commanding views over the Firth of Forth.

He is buried in Dean Cemetery in Edinburgh on the central path of the north section in the original cemetery.

Tribute
The John Murray Laboratories at the University of Edinburgh, the John Murray Society at the University of Newcastle and the Scottish Environment Protection Agency research vessel, the S.V. Sir John Murray, and the Murray Glacier are named after him.

Taxa named in his honor 
Silvascincus murrayi (Murray's skink), a species of Australian lizard, is named in his honour.

Halieutopsis murrayi H. C. Ho, 2022 (Murray’s deepsea batfish)

Trachyrhynchus murrayi Günther, 1887

The salt water worm Phallonemertes murrayi (Brinkmann, 1912)

Murrayona Kirkpatrick, 1910

Stellitethya murrayi Sarà & Bavestrello, 1996

The fish Triglops murrayi Günther, 1888

Munneurycope murrayi (Walker, 1903)

Lanceola murrayi Norman, 1900

Potamethus murrayi (M'Intosh, 1916)

Mesothuria murrayi (Théel, 1886)

Bythotiara murrayi Günther, 1903

Anthoptilum murrayi Kölliker, 1880

Sophrosyne murrayi Stebbing, 1888

Millepora murrayi Quelch, 1886

Phascolion murrayi Stephen, 1941

Munnopsurus murrayi (Walker, 1903)

The Blind Octopus Cirrothauma murrayi Chun, 1911

Culeolus murrayi Herdman, 1881

Deltocyathus murrayi Gardiner & Waugh, 1938

Bathyraja murrayi (Günther, 1880)

Psammastra murrayi Sollas, 1886

Lithodes murrayi Henderson, 1888 

Pythonaster murrayi Sladen, 1889

Botanical references

See also
 European and American voyages of scientific exploration

References

External links

 
 
On the 1910 Murray and Hjort expedition and the Cirrothauma murrayi octopus

1841 births
1914 deaths
Knights Commander of the Order of the Bath
People from Cobourg
Road incident deaths in Scotland
People educated at Stirling High School
Canadian people of Scottish descent
Scottish biologists
Scottish explorers
Scottish non-fiction writers
Alumni of the University of Edinburgh
Pre-Confederation Ontario people
Royal Medal winners
Recipients of the Cullum Geographical Medal
Recipients of the Pour le Mérite (civil class)
Scottish marine biologists
Scottish oceanographers
Fellows of the Royal Society
Fellows of the Royal Society of Edinburgh
Presidents of the Royal Scottish Geographical Society
Foreign associates of the National Academy of Sciences
Burials at the Dean Cemetery
Scottish surgeons
British limnologists
Scottish naturalists